Sergio Hernán Ubillús Segura (born 1 January 1980) is a Peruvian footballer who plays as a left back for Cobresol in the Torneo Descentralizado.

Club career
Sergio Ubillús began his senior career in the Torneo Descentralizado with Universitario de Deportes in the 2000 season playing under manager Roberto Challe. He stayed with Universitario only until the next season.

References

External links 

1980 births
Living people
People from Chiclayo
Peruvian footballers
Club Universitario de Deportes footballers
Juan Aurich footballers
Cienciano footballers
Sport Boys footballers
Club Deportivo Universidad de San Martín de Porres players
Sport Áncash footballers
Club Deportivo Universidad César Vallejo footballers
Total Chalaco footballers
Cobresol FBC footballers
Peruvian Primera División players
Association football fullbacks